Peter F. Steinfels (born 1941) is an American journalist and educator best known for his writings on religious topics.

A native of Chicago, Illinois, and a lifelong Roman Catholic, Steinfels earned his Ph.D. from Columbia University and joined the staff of the journal Commonweal in 1964. He served as a visiting professor at Notre Dame in 1994–95 and then as visiting professor at Georgetown University from 1997 to 2001. From 1990 to 2010, he wrote a column called "Beliefs" for the religion section of The New York Times.

He has also been a professor at Fordham University and co-director of the Fordham Center on Religion and Culture. Steinfels has written several books, including The Neoconservatives: The Men Who Are Changing America's Politics and A People Adrift: The Crisis of the Roman Catholic Church in America.

He has argued in favor of the ordination of women as priests and deacons, and has suggested that this could eventually lead to the creation of female cardinals.

In 2003, he was awarded the Laetare Medal by the University of Notre Dame, the oldest and most prestigious award for American Catholics.

Family
He is married to Margaret O'Brien Steinfels, a writer and former editor of Commonweal. They have two children, Gabrielle Steinfels and John Melville Steinfels.

References

External links
Biography
Interview with PBS's Bob Abernethy
 

1941 births
American columnists
American religious writers
Columbia University alumni
Fordham University faculty
Georgetown University faculty
Living people
The New York Times columnists
Writers from Chicago
Roman Catholic writers
University of Notre Dame faculty
Laetare Medal recipients
20th-century American journalists
American male journalists
Religion journalists